The fals (plural fulus) was a medieval copper coin first produced by the Umayyad caliphate (661–750) beginning in the late 7th century. The name of the coin is derived from the follis, a Roman and later Byzantine copper coin. The fals usually featured ornate Arabic script on both sides. Various copper fals were produced until the 19th century. Their weight varied, from one gram to ten grams or more.

The term is still used in modern spoken Arabic for money, but pronounced 'fils'. It is also absorbed into Malay language through the word fulus .

In popular culture

 The Malay derivant fulus was used as basis for naming the fictional setting of Metrofulus in the 2006 Malaysian superhero film Cicakman.

See also

Daughter currencies:
Fils, a subdivision of the dinar, dirham or rial
Falus, coin of Morocco (1672–1901)

References

Coins
Coins of the medieval Islamic world
Umayyad Caliphate
Numismatics
Islamic banking
Islamic banking and finance terminology